Henry "Harry" Munday (12 May 1847 – 22 September 1926) was a British sports shooter. He competed in the 50 yard free pistol event at the 1908 Summer Olympics.

References

1847 births
1926 deaths
British male sport shooters
Olympic shooters of Great Britain
Shooters at the 1908 Summer Olympics
Place of birth missing